Dallas Wiens (born May 6, 1985) is the recipient of the United States first full face transplant operation, performed at the Brigham and Women's Hospital during the week of March 14, 2011. It was the first such operation in United States and the third in the world.

Facial disfigurement
Wiens was burned by a high voltage wire on November 13, 2008, when he was painting Ridglea Baptist Church in Fort Worth, Texas. He was standing inside a boom lift when his forehead made contact with a high-voltage wire. Transported by helicopter to Parkland Memorial Hospital, surgeons performed more than a dozen debridement procedures over approximately two months to remove the burned skin. As part of this process, they enucleated his left eye, and set his right eye back in its socket before covering it with a skin flap to protect it from further damage. Later, surgeons spent 36 hours over two days working to reconstruct Wiens's face using muscle from his back. This left him with half of his scalp, a small portion of flesh on the left side of his chin, and without eyebrows, eyelids, a nose or lips, though he had a horizontal opening for his mouth.

Recovery
Wiens was left permanently blind and without lips, a nose or eyebrows. Doctors told the family that Wiens would likely be paralyzed from the neck down and would never speak or produce enough saliva to eat solid food. They put him in a medically induced coma for three months. After awakening, and becoming frustrated with attempts to teach him how to communicate using a computer, Wiens started learning how to speak, despite having being told that it was not possible. Having made unprecedented progress, he was given a speaking tracheotomy to help him speak more easily. Soon after, he was able to hold himself up with this legs, and so was provided with physical therapy in order to further strengthen his legs. Though acting against medical advice, Wiens demonstrated that he was capable of eating solid food in March 2009. He left the hospital in May 2009, using a wheelchair for the majority of the time. However, he was walking without the wheelchair by Christmas 2009.

In March 2011, a transplant team of more than 30 doctors and nurses, alongside 8 surgeons from across multiple disciplines, led by Bohdan Pomahač, performed a full face transplant at Brigham and Women's Hospital in Boston. It took 15 hours. Wiens' sight could not be recovered in this surgery, so he was fitted with an acrylic ocular prosthesis, which sits over the skin currently protecting his right eye. He has been able to talk on the phone and has regained his sense of smell. The operation was paid for with the help of the US Department of Defense, which hopes to gain knowledge from the procedure to help soldiers suffering from facial injuries. 

Wiens has undergone more than fifty surgeries since his injury in 2008. He will need more surgery in the future.

Public appearance
On May 9, 2011, Wiens made his first public appearance after the surgery, wearing dark sunglasses. He said that his young daughter told him "Daddy, you're so handsome" when she saw him after the operation. He also said of his new face, "It feels as if it has become my own."

Personal life
On  January 20, 2013, Wiens married fellow Parkland Hospital burn patient Jamie Nash of Crandall, Texas, whom he met at a burn survivors support group. Wiens and Nash separated in 2018 and were divorced in early 2021. 

Wiens is currently in a relationship with Annalyn Bell who, like him, is blind. 

He has a daughter from a previous relationship, who was born prior to his injury.

See also

 Connie Culp
 Isabelle Dinoire

References

External links
 Dallas Wiens Before and After
 Gallery with images and videos of Dallas Wiens
 Dallas Wiens Facebook Page

1985 births
Living people
People from Fort Worth, Texas
Face transplant recipients
American blind people